John Carlson (born January 10, 1990) is an American professional ice hockey defenseman and alternate captain for the Washington Capitals of the National Hockey League (NHL). He was drafted by the Capitals in the first round, 27th overall, in the 2008 NHL Entry Draft after playing a year in the United States Hockey League (USHL) with the Indiana Ice. Before reaching the NHL, Carlson played junior hockey in the Ontario Hockey League (OHL) with the London Knights and played professionally with the Capitals' American Hockey League  (AHL) affiliate, the Hershey Bears. He also participated internationally for the United States in the 2010 World Juniors and 2014 Winter Olympics. Carlson won the Stanley Cup as a member of the Capitals in 2018, as the highest scoring defenseman during the playoffs.

Playing career

Minor and Junior
Carlson began his ice hockey career with the New Jersey Rockets Youth Hockey Organization of the Atlantic Youth Hockey League.

He lived near the New Jersey Rockets Organization based in Newark, New Jersey, for Tier II and Juniors and Somerset, New Jersey, for Tier I. According to Eliteprospects.com, Carlson scored 50 points in 44 games in his final year with the Rockets, earning him the 2006-07 Atlantic Junior Hockey League (AtJHL) Offensive Defenseman of the Year Award. He attended St. Joseph High School in Metuchen, New Jersey, for three years, but he only played for the high school team during his freshman year, the 2004–05 season. In 21 games with St. Joseph, Carlson registered 12 goals and 19 points. Carlson attended Cathedral High School in Indianapolis for his senior year while he played juniors for the Indiana Ice of the USHL.

Carlson played a full season in the USHL with the Ice in 2007–08, scoring 12 goals and 43 points in 59 games, earning him the USHL's second All-Star team and All-Rookie team honors. After a productive rookie season in the USHL, Carlson was drafted in the first round, 27th overall, by the Washington Capitals in the 2008 NHL entry draft. Carlson was originally committed to play college hockey for the University of Massachusetts, but signed to play for the London Knights of the OHL after being drafted by them in the 2nd round of the 2008 OHL draft. During the 2008–09 OHL season, Carlson notched 76 points, including 16 goals, helping the Knights secure the Midwest Division Title. During the playoffs, Carlson scored another 22 points in 14 games, advancing to the Western Conference Finals. His efforts during the OHL season helped him make the OHL second All-Star team, the OHL first All-Rookie team, and the Canadian Hockey League (CHL) All-Rookie team.

Professional

Washington Capitals
Carlson made his professional debut for the Capitals' American Hockey League (AHL) affiliate, the Hershey Bears, on May 2, 2009, in a Calder Cup playoff game against the Wilkes-Barre/Scranton Penguins. The following night, he scored his first professional goal in Game 2 of the series. Carlson played a total of 16 games for the Bears that postseason, helping them become the 2009 Calder Cup Champions.

Carlson made his NHL debut for the Capitals on November 21, 2009, against the Toronto Maple Leafs. On January 21, 2010, Carlson was recalled by the Capitals. On March 25, 2010, Carlson scored his first NHL goal, against Manny Legace of the Carolina Hurricanes.

In Game 2 of the Capitals' 2010 Stanley Cup playoff first-round series against the Montreal Canadiens, Carlson scored his first NHL playoff goal, tying the game with just over one minute to play in regulation. After the Capitals' elimination in the playoffs, Carlson rejoined the Hershey Bears in their playoff campaign and scored the game- and Calder Cup-winning goal in Game 6 of the Calder Cup Final against the Texas Stars.

On September 14, 2012, Carlson signed a six-year, $23.8 million contract extension with the Capitals.

Carlson's 2015–16 season was interrupted by an injury that limited to him playing just 56 regular season games, ending his streak of playing in all 82 regular season games every season for the Capitals from the 2010–11 season to the 2014–15 season. Carlson was injured in late December 2015, and his injury emerged again throughout the second half of the 2015–16 season. Despite the injury, Carlson scored 39 points by the end of the regular season.

During the 2017–18 season, the last year of his contract, Carlson had a career year, putting up career numbers in goals and assists. He played in all 82 games during regular season, and his success helped push the Capitals to the 2018 playoffs. At the conclusion of the regular season, Carlson led NHL defensemen in points with 68 and became the first Capitals defenseman since Mike Green in the 2009–10 season to score 60 points in a season. Carlson's 2017-18 campaign ended with a Stanley Cup victory and a fifth-place finish in Norris Trophy voting.

On June 24, 2018, having just won the Stanley Cup with Washington, Carlson signed an eight-year, $64 million contract extension with the Capitals.

Returning to the Washington lineup after an injury for a November 11, 2018, for a game against the Arizona Coyotes, Carlson skated in his 623rd career game as a defenseman, passing Sylvain Côté for sixth place in games played for the Capitals. He had missed one game with a lower-body injury announced on November 9, 2018. Carlson ended his 2018–19 season with 13 goals and 70 points in 80 games. He finished fourth in Norris Trophy voting, behind Victor Hedman, Brent Burns, and Mark Giordano. Carlson also made his first all star appearance this season.

Prior to the start of the 2019–20 season, the Capitals named Carlson as an alternate captain, filling the void created by defenseman Brooks Orpik's retirement. On December 4, 2019, he netted his 100th career NHL goal against the Los Angeles Kings, his 10th of the season. During the 2019–20 season, Carlson surpassed the 70 point mark for the second year in a row, leading all defensemen in the league in points for the second season in a row with 75 in 69 games. His play led to his second all star selection, as well as being named a finalist in Norris Trophy voting along with Victor Hedman and Roman Josi.

International play

Junior 
Carlson was an alternate captain for the United States in the 2010 World Junior Ice Hockey Championships. On January 5, 2010, he scored the game-winning goal in overtime of the gold medal game as part of a two-goal effort to defeat Canada 6–5. Carlson finished the tournament with 7 points in 7 games. Additionally, he was named to the tournament's all-star team.
 
In December 2010, Carlson was named to NHL.com's All-Time World Junior Championship team.

Olympics 
On January 1, 2014, Carlson was named to the U.S. roster for the 2014 Winter Olympics in Sochi. On February 13, 2014, he scored the Americans' first goal of the tournament, at 15:27 of the first period of the nation's opening match against Slovakia. His goal was scored on his first shot in the tournament, giving him consecutive goals on shots in international play for the U.S. In a total of 6 games with Team USA, Carlson put up a goal and an assist.

Personal life
Carlson was born in Natick, Massachusetts, and lived in Marlborough, Massachusetts. His family moved to the Colonia section of Woodbridge Township, New Jersey, when he was five years old. Carlson has an older brother, Andrew, whom he played high school hockey with for one season. Carlson is of Swedish descent on his father's side and Italian on his mother's. On September 6, 2014, Carlson married his long-time girlfriend Gina Nucci, and in June 2015, they had their firstborn child, a son named Lucca. They had their second child, a boy named Rudy, in May 2018. The couple welcomed their third child, a boy named Sawyer, in November of 2020.

Career statistics

Regular season and playoffs

International

Awards and honors

References

External links

 

1990 births
American men's ice hockey defensemen
American people of Swedish descent
Hershey Bears players
Ice hockey players from Massachusetts
Ice hockey players from New Jersey
Indiana Ice players
Living people
National Hockey League first-round draft picks
Olympic ice hockey players of the United States
Ice hockey players at the 2014 Winter Olympics
People from Natick, Massachusetts
People from Woodbridge Township, New Jersey
Sportspeople from Middlesex County, Massachusetts
Sportspeople from Middlesex County, New Jersey
St. Joseph High School (Metuchen, New Jersey) alumni
Washington Capitals draft picks
Washington Capitals players
Stanley Cup champions